Siderolamprus owenii, Owen's galliwasp, is a species of lizard of the Diploglossidae family. It is found in Mexico and Guatemala. It was named after British biologist and paleontologist Richard Owen.

It was formerly classified in the genus Diploglossus, but was moved to Siderolamprus in 2021.

References

Siderolamprus
Reptiles described in 1839
Reptiles of Mexico
Reptiles of Guatemala
Taxa named by André Marie Constant Duméril
Taxa named by Gabriel Bibron